Gustavo Custódio dos Santos (born on 9 March 1997), known as Gustavo Custódio or simply Gustavo, is a Brazilian footballer who plays as a forward for Bahia.

Club career
Born in São Paulo, Gustavo Custódio made his senior debut with Nacional-AM in 2018. In that year, he also represented Audax and Guarulhos.

On 9 December 2018, Gustavo Custódio joined Jequié for the ensuing campaign. The following 9 April, he moved to Bahia and was initially assigned to the under-23 squad.

On 29 May 2020, after helping his side win the 2020 Campeonato Baiano, Gustavo Custódio renewed his contract with Bahia until the end of 2021. On 6 July, however, he was transferred to K League 1 side Incheon United FC, who paid R$ 2.2 million for 80% of his economic rights.

On 9 November 2020, after only three matches for Incheon, Gustavo Custódio announced his departure from the club through his Instagram account. He subsequently returned to Bahia, being again assigned to the under-23 squad.

Career statistics

Honours
Bahia
Campeonato Baiano: 2020

References

External links
Bahia profile 
	

1997 births
Living people
Footballers from São Paulo
Brazilian footballers
Association football forwards
Campeonato Brasileiro Série D players
Grêmio Osasco Audax Esporte Clube players
Nacional Futebol Clube players
Associação Desportiva Jequié players
Esporte Clube Bahia players
K League 1 players
Incheon United FC players
Brazilian expatriate footballers
Brazilian expatriate sportspeople in South Korea
Expatriate footballers in South Korea